The Catholic Conference is a high school sports conference comprising girls athletic programs in Delaware. Members include:

Padua Academy
St. Elizabeth High School
Ursuline Academy

References

Delaware high school sports conferences
Roman Catholic Diocese of Wilmington